Vazeilles-près-Saugues (Auvergnat: Vaselhas) is a former commune in the Haute-Loire department in south-central France. On 1 January 2016, it was merged into the new commune Esplantas-Vazeilles. Its population was 35 in 2019.

See also
Communes of the Haute-Loire department

References 

Vazeillespressaugues
Populated places disestablished in 2016